The 2023 Orlando City SC season will be the club's 13th season of existence in Orlando and ninth season as a Major League Soccer franchise, the top-flight league in the United States soccer league system. As well as MLS, Orlando will contest three other competitions: the U.S. Open Cup as defending champions, Leagues Cup, as well as the CONCACAF Champions League for the first time.

Season review

Pre-season 
Orlando made its first offseason move on November 9, trading $300,000 in general allocation money plus potential future add-ons to Toronto FC in exchange for Luca Petrasso. A day later it was announced Júnior Urso and the club had agreed to mutually terminate his contract so he could return to Brazil due to personal circumstances. At the time of his departure, he had made the eighth-most appearances for the club. As part of the end of season roster decisions, Orlando City announced the departures of Tesho Akindele, who ranked second all-time in appearances for the club in all competitions with 121 behind only Chris Mueller and sixth for goals with 21 at the time of his departure, as well as injury-plagued Alexandre Pato and former draft pick Joey DeZart. Wilder Cartagena had his loan extension option exercised. Club captain Mauricio Pereyra was signed to a new two-year contract using allocation money meaning he would no longer occupy a Designated Player slot. 11-year MLS veteran Felipe Martins was signed as a free agent and Favian Loyola became the third offseason signing when he was signed to a homegrown contract.

With the addition of St. Louis City SC in 2023, MLS held an Expansion Draft on November 11, 2022. St. Louis selected Nicholas Gioacchini who had joined Orlando in July 2022 and made seven appearances in all competitions for the team.

In December, Orlando confirmed further player departures: João Moutinho sealed a move to Italian side Spezia following the expiration of his contract, while the club traded away both Andrés Perea to Philadelphia Union for allocation money and Ruan to D.C. United in exchange for the #2 overall pick in the 2023 MLS SuperDraft, later used to select Generation Adidas signee Shakur Mohammed. He was one of four players selected by Orlando. Homegrown player Benji Michel departed for Portugal as a free agent, joining Arouca, while Jake Mulraney was sold, returning home to Ireland to sign with St Patrick's Athletic. With a flurry of key departures, Orlando undertook significant recruitment in January, signing defender Rafael Santos from Cruzeiro, new Designated Player Martín Ojeda and Under-22 initiative player Ramiro Enrique both out of Argentina, as well as Icelandic international midfielder Dagur Dan Þórhallsson.

Also during the offseason, Ercan Kara, Facundo Torres and Gastón González all received green cards meaning they no longer occupied international roster spots.

February 
Orlando City opened the season on February 25 at home to New York Red Bulls. Having weathered heavy New York pressure in the first half, the Lions opened the scoring with their first shot of the match in the 56th minute courtesy of a Facundo Torres penalty after Sean Nealis was ajudged to have handled the ball. Orlando held on for the 1–0 victory, preserving their opening day unbeaten streak since joining MLS in 2015 (3W 6D 0L).

March 
The team remained at home for week two, hosting FC Cincinnati. Pareja made five changes to his starting lineup including handing debuts to Gastón González and Abdi Salim but the offensive struggles continued as the Lions registered only one shot on goal in a 0–0 draw. Three days later, on March 7, Orlando debuted in the CONCACAF Champions League away to 2020 winners Tigres UANL. The Lions took a goalless draw from the round of 16 first leg, largely thanks to an eight-save performance from Pedro Gallese who kept his third shutout in as many games to start the season. The team finally conceded for the first time on March 11 as part of a 1–1 draw with D.C. United. Rookie Duncan McGuire debuted from the start and, after a goalless first half, gave the Lions the lead in the 53rd minute when he guided a Dagur Dan Þórhallsson header home from two yards. D.C. were awarded a penalty five minutes later for a supposed handball from Wilder Cartagena before a VAR review overturned the decision after judging it hit his body instead. D.C. eventually found an equalizer through Chris Durkin who cut back and struck a fierce left-footed shot across goal from the top of the box in the 80th minute. Orlando remained unbeaten in all competitions to begin the year but extended the winless streak to three. Four days later, Orlando returned to Champions League action for the second leg against Tigres. In a game of two halves, Tigres went in to the break with a one goal lead after Sebastián Córdova managed to find himself with enough time and space inside the penalty area to bring down a looping cross and slide the ball under Gallese. However, Orlando were the better side in the second half as they pushed forward for an equaliser. It eventually came in the 89th minute as substiute Ercan Kara scored his first goal of the season, an acrobatic bicycle kick, but it was a case of too little too late as Orlando were eliminated on the away goals rule as the game finished 1–1 both on the night and on aggregate. Head coach Óscar Pareja receieved a red card after the final whistle for confronting the referee about the lack of time added on as Tigres tried to waste time to see out the game: "We scored in minute 89 and between 89 and 96:45 it was four minutes 50 seconds that they did not play the game." Orlando's undefeated start to the season ended at home to bottom of the table Charlotte FC on March 18. Having controlled the opening exchanges and had an early goal ruled out for offside, Orlando were caught out when Charlotte capitalized on the Lions' high line as Enzo Copetti found himself one on one with Gallese from a long ball and was able to slot home before the visitors double the lead through Kerwin Vargas' speculative shot from the edge of the box. Orlando responded after half time with a goal in the 57th minute as Martín Ojeda was first to a loose ball in the penalty area to score his first for the club, and spent much of the second half threatening to equalize, seeing the ball in the back of the net again only for the goal to be ruled offside for a second time. Despite attempting 19 shots to Charlotte's eight, the Lions lost 2–1, giving Charlotte their first points of the season.

Roster 

 Last updated on February 22, 2023

Staff

Competitions

Friendlies 
Orlando City opened preseason camp on January 9. Six friendly matches were scheduled with all but one to be played behind closed doors.

Major League Soccer 

Outside of the club, St. Louis City joined the league as an expansion franchise, bringing the total number of MLS clubs to 29.

Results summary

Results

Standings
Eastern Conference table

Overall table

U.S. Open Cup 

Orlando will entered in the round of 32 , a round later than the previous year, as one of four MLS teams competing in the CONCACAF Champions League.

CONCACAF Champions League 

Orlando contested the CONCACAF Champions League for the first time in 2023 having qualified as 2022 U.S. Open Cup champions. It was the club's second time appearing in continental competition after the 2021 Leagues Cup.

Leagues Cup 

The third edition of the Leagues Cup will feature every MLS and Liga MX team for the first time with both leagues taking a month-long pause in their respective seasons to complete the "World Cup-style" tournament. Orlando City will enter at the group stage as a seeded team.

Group stage

Squad statistics

Appearances 

Starting appearances are listed first, followed by substitute appearances after the + symbol where applicable.

|-
! colspan=14 style=background:#dcdcdc; text-align:center|Goalkeepers

|-
! colspan=14 style=background:#dcdcdc; text-align:center|Defenders

|-
! colspan=14 style=background:#dcdcdc; text-align:center|Midfielders

|-
! colspan=14 style=background:#dcdcdc; text-align:center|Forwards

|}

Goalscorers

Shutouts

Disciplinary record

Player movement 
Per Major League Soccer and club policies, terms of the deals do not get disclosed.

MLS SuperDraft picks 
Draft picks are not automatically signed to the team roster. The 2023 MLS SuperDraft was held on December 21, 2022. Orlando made four selections.

Transfers in

Loans in

Transfers out

References 

Orlando City SC seasons
Orlando City
Orlando City
Orlando City